Emily Nicholl (born 24 May 1994) is a Scottish netball player. She was selected to represent the Scotland netball team at the 2019 Netball World Cup.

References

External links
 

1994 births
Living people
Scottish netball players
Place of birth missing (living people)
Netball players at the 2018 Commonwealth Games
Commonwealth Games competitors for Scotland
2019 Netball World Cup players
Sirens Netball players
Netball Superleague players